Yaminan-e Sofla (also Romanized as Yamīnān-e Soflá; also known as Yamanān, Yamīnān, Yamīnān-e Pā'īn, Yamnān, Yamnān-e Pā’īn, and Yamnān-e Soflá) is a village in Avalan Rural District, Muchesh District, Kamyaran County, Kurdistan Province, Iran. At the 2006 census, its population was 518, in 132 families. The village is populated by Kurds.

References 

Towns and villages in Kamyaran County
Kurdish settlements in Kurdistan Province